Hans Erik Wilhelm Sahlin (8 May 1946 – 10 November 2013) was a Swedish luger. He won the national title in 1967 and placed 25th in the singles event at the 1968 Winter Olympics.

References

External links
 

1946 births
Living people
Swedish male lugers
Olympic lugers of Sweden
Lugers at the 1968 Winter Olympics
People from Östersund
Sportspeople from Jämtland County